Sawunda Hannadige Martin Gunadasa (born 12 February 1930 – died 9 February 2010 as මාටින් ගුණදාස) [Sinhala]), popularly known as Martin Gunadasa, was an actor in Sri Lankan cinema, stage drama and television. His most popular role was that of Polee Mudalali in the television serial Kopi Kade.

Personal life
Martin Gunadasa was born on 12 February 1930 in Matara.

Gunadasa died on 9 February 2010 at the age of 79 after a brief illness. His remains were buried in Borella cemetery on 11 February 2010.

Career
He acted in Vesak and Poson stage dramas during school times. Later he arrived Colombo to succeed his ambition to be an actor. Meanwhile, he worked in the government press. Then he became a trade unionist and lost the job during 1981 July strike. After losing his job, he started to produce stage dramas.

In 1965, Gunadasa made his maiden cinema appearance in the film Saaravita. However, his second film Sudo Sudu screened before his first film. Then he acted in many supportive roles particularly as the arrogant "Mudalali" in many films including, Hatha Maha Nidhanaya, Hathara Wate, Kapatikama, Pickpocket, Indunila, Kalana Mithuro and Sinawai Inawai. He also worked as a singer and musician. In 2007, he acted in the stage play Weyan Piyambahi, which centers around HIV/AIDS disease discussing the effects of the disease.

In 1987, Gunadasa was selected to the television serial Kopi Kade by Thevis Guruge. His role as "Poli Mudalali" became highly popularized among the public and he was usually known by his character name rather than real name. He appeared in the series from the beginning which first aired on 1 April 1987. He continued to act in the series for more than 20 consecutive years in 1192 episodes.

Filmography

References

External links
 "කෝපි කඩේ" ටෙලි නාට්‍ය මාලාව: ශිල්පීන් ඇගයීම
 ඕපාදූපකාරයන්ට අබිලිං නම තැබූ කෝපි කඩේ අබිලිං මාමා
 කෝපි කඩේට තිස් වසරයි ග්‍රාමසේවක ආරියසේන හඳුවල විස්තර කරයි

Sri Lankan male film actors
Sinhalese male actors
1930 births
2010 deaths